Phrynidius salvadorensis is a species of beetle in the family Cerambycidae. It was described by Franz in 1954. It contains two subspecies, P. salvadorensis montecristensis and
P. salvadorensis salvadorensis.

References

Apomecynini
Beetles described in 1954